Alì Terme is a comune (municipality) in the Metropolitan City of Messina in the Italian region Sicily, located about  east of Palermo and about  southwest of Messina.

Alì Terme borders the following municipalities: Alì, Fiumedinisi, Itala, Nizza di Sicilia.

People
 Stefano D'Arrigo (1919–1992)

References

External links
Official website

Cities and towns in Sicily
Articles which contain graphical timelines